The Jewish Hospital of Tunis (arabe : المستشفى الإسرائيلي بتونس) was a former Tunisian hospital founded for the Tunisian Jewish community. It was founded by Jewish doctors from Livorno. It opened in 1895 at Place Halfaouine, a suburb north of the Medina of Tunis.

Housed in the Khaznadar Palace, it was dedicated to the Jews living in the Hara Quarter of the Tunis Medina.

References

1895 establishments in the French colonial empire
Hospitals established in 1895
Hospitals in Tunisia
Defunct hospitals
Hospitals disestablished in 1956
Italian-Jewish culture in Tunisia
Jews and Judaism in Tunis